The Pale Pacific (formerly The Pale) is an indie rock/powerpop band from Bellingham, Washington. The Pale Pacific began as a collaboration between Gabe Archer and his cousin Cameron Nicklaus, with Archer on piano/keyboards and Nicklaus on drums.

Discography
First Attempt at World Domination (1997) - Always Never Records 
Another Innovative Idea for the People on the Go (2001) - Always Never Records
Gravity Gets Things Done (2003) - Always Never Records, (2004) - SideCho Records
The Pale/Copeland split EP (2003) - SideCho Records
Rules Are Predictable EP (2005) - SideCho Records
Urgency (2005) - SideCho Records
There Is a Cover Song EP (2010) - Released as a free download
There Is a Song Headed Straight for Your Face (2010) - Recorded live at The Crocodile on August 11, 2007

Also appeared on
¡Policia!: A Tribute to the Police (2005) (As The Pale) - Walking on the Moon
Live From the Morning Alternative Vol. 2, The End 107.7 (2005)  - Gravity Gets Things Done (Live Acoustic)

Band members

Current
 Gabe Archer – lead vocals, guitar, keyboard (1994–present)
 Cameron Nicklaus – guitar (1994–present)
 Justin Harcus – bass (2005–present)
 Greg Swinehart – drums, background vocals (2000–present)

Past
 Jared Archer – bass, guitar (1998-2001)
 Lance Fisher – bass (2002)
 Ryan Worsley – bass (2003-2004)
 Nate Beede – guitar (2003)

References

External links
The Pale Pacific's official website
The Pale Pacific on MySpace
The Pale Pacific on Facebook

Musical groups from Washington (state)